Miltochrista gratiosa is a moth of the family Erebidae. It was described by Félix Édouard Guérin-Méneville in 1843. It is found in Nepal, Japan and Sikkim, India.

References

 

gratiosa
Moths described in 1843
Moths of Asia